Shur Mast-e Rudbar (also Romanized as Shūr Mast-e Rūdbār) is a village in Rastupey Rural District, in the Central District of Savadkuh County, Mazandaran Province, Iran. At the 2006 census, its population was 138, in 43 families.

References 

Populated places in Savadkuh County